Círculo Gijón Baloncesto y Conocimiento is a professional basketball club based in Gijón, Asturias that currently plays in LEB Plata, the third tier of Spanish basketball.

History

Círculo Gijón Baloncesto y Conocimiento was founded in 2017, by a group of entrepreneurs that acquired the rights of local club CD Barrio La Arena, with the aim of giving to the city of Gijón a completely professional basketball team with possibilities to promote to the top leagues, as did the former main team Gijón Baloncesto, that played in Liga ACB during four seasons.

The club started in the Primera División, fifth tier, and played its first official game on 19 October 2017 in Avilés, beating Colegio San Fernando by 65–72. On 12 February 2018, Círculo Gijón signed former NBA player Robert Swift for two seasons.

However, Círculo Gijón did not achieve promotion to Liga EBA after being defeated in the league semifinals by the reserve team of Oviedo CB. Despite this failure, the club required and finally achieved one of the eight places that would be created after the expansion of the LEB Plata, third division, to 24 teams.

On 6 October 2018, the club made its debut in professional leagues with a 73–65 home win against Óbila CB. However, Círculo Gijón could not avoid relegation to Liga EBA at the end of the season, after an irregular performance.

Círculo Gijón remained in the league as a result of a swap of places with Baskonia B, that finished one position over the geometrics.

Sponsorship naming
TeslaCard Círculo Gijón 2018–2019

Kit manufacturers and shirt sponsors

Head coaches
Nacho Galán 2017–present

Season by season

Players

Current roster

Depth chart

Trophies and awards

Trophies
Friendly tournaments
Trofeo Virgen de Valencia: 2018
Trofeo Concello de Chantada: 2018
Trofeo Principado de Asturias: 2018

Individual awards
All LEB Plata team
Saúl Blanco – 2019

Notable players

 Saúl Blanco
 Pieter Prinsloo
 Robert Swift

References

External links
 
Profile at Asturcesto 

 
Basketball teams in Asturias
Sport in Gijón
Basketball teams established in 2017
LEB Plata teams